Sterling Bradford Shearer (born August 10, 1955) is a former American college and professional football player who was a defensive lineman in the National Football League (NFL) for three seasons.  He played college football for the University of Texas, received consensus All-American honors, and was recognized as the best college interior lineman in the country.  A third-round pick in the 1978 NFL Draft, he played professionally for the NFL's Chicago Bears.

Early years 

Shearer was born in Houston, Texas.  He graduated from Westlake High School in Westlake Hills, Texas, a suburb of Austin, where he played for the Westlake Chaparrals high school football team.

College career 

Shearer received an athletic scholarship to attend the University of Texas at Austin, where he played for the Texas Longhorns football team from 1974 to 1977.  He was a two-time All-Southwestern Conference selection in (1975, 1977),  As a senior team captain in 1977, he averaged ten tackles per game, led the Longhorns to a No. 1 ranking, and was recognized as a consensus first-team All-American.  He was also awarded the Outland Trophy, recognizing him as the best interior lineman during the 1977 college football season.

Professional career 

In three NFL seasons, he appeared in thirty-four regular season games for the Bears, and started two of them. He did not play during the  regular season, and his pro career was later cut short by a knee injury.

See also 

 1977 College Football All-America Team
 List of Texas Longhorns football All-Americans
 Texas Longhorns

References 

1955 births
Living people
All-American college football players
American football defensive tackles
Chicago Bears players
Texas Longhorns football players